was a Japanese television host and writer. He also served briefly as a member of the House of Councillors in the Diet of Japan. His real name was Ōhashi Katsumi (大橋 克巳).

Born in Sumida, Tokyo, he grew up in Chiba prefecture and dropped out of the Waseda University. Declaring "semi-retirement", he then spent most of his time outside Japan, particularly in Canada during the summer, as well as in Australia and New Zealand during the winter in the northern hemisphere, in which he ran his "OK Gift Shop" (OK stands for Ohashi Kyosen).

When he resigned in the House of Councillors, Ōhashi was succeeded by Marutei Tsurunen, the first European-descended and openly foreign-born Japanese person to serve in the Diet.

References

External links 
 http://www.kyosen.com/ - the official website (this website appears to be down)

1934 births
2016 deaths
Japanese television personalities
Japanese television writers
Japanese music critics
Japanese critics
Japanese essayists
Japanese businesspeople
Japanese actor-politicians
Members of the House of Councillors (Japan)
Japanese racehorse owners and breeders
Japanese expatriates in Canada
Japanese expatriates in Australia
Japanese expatriates in New Zealand
Male actors from Tokyo
Politicians from Tokyo
People from Chiba Prefecture
Waseda University alumni
Writers from Chiba Prefecture
Male television writers